Lucius Junius Brutus ( 6th century BC) was the semi-legendary founder of the Roman Republic, and traditionally one of its first consuls in 509 BC. He was reputedly responsible for the expulsion of his uncle the Roman king Tarquinius Superbus after the suicide of Lucretia, which led to the overthrow of the Roman monarchy. He was involved in the abdication of fellow consul Tarquinius Collatinus, and executed two of his sons for plotting the restoration of the Tarquins.

He was claimed as an ancestor of the Roman gens Junia, including Decimus Junius Brutus, and Marcus Junius Brutus, the most famous of Julius Caesar's assassins. Traditions about his life may have been fictional, and some scholars argue that it was the Etruscan king Porsenna who overthrew Tarquinius. The plebeian status of the Junia gens has also raised doubts about his position as a consul and the alleged initial patrician domination of the office. Depicted as the nephew of Tarquinius, he may have symbolized the internal tensions that occurred during the transition between the monarchy and the republic.

Background and historicity 
Prior to the establishment of the Roman Republic, Rome had been ruled by kings. 

The account is from Livy's Ab urbe condita and deals with a point in the history of Rome prior to reliable historical records (virtually all prior records were destroyed by the Gauls when they sacked Rome under Brennus in 390 BC or 387 BC).

Modern historians have challenged almost every part of the traditional story from Livy:

Overthrow of the monarchy

According to Roman tradition, Brutus led the revolt that overthrew the last king, Lucius Tarquinius Superbus. The coup was prompted by the rape of the noblewoman Lucretia by the second son of the king, Sextus Tarquinius; Brutus was joined in this plotting by among others, Lucretia's father, Spurius Lucretius Tricipitinus and Publius Valerius Poplicola.

Brutus was the son of Tarquinia, daughter of Rome's fifth king Lucius Tarquinius Priscus and sister to Rome's seventh king Tarquinius Superbus.

According to Livy, Brutus had a number of grievances against his uncle the king. Amongst them was the fact that Tarquinius had put to death a number of the chief men of Rome, including Brutus' brother.  Brutus avoided the distrust of Tarquinius's family by feigning that he was slow-witted (in Latin brutus translates to dullard).

He accompanied Tarquinius's sons on a trip to the Oracle of Delphi. The sons asked the oracle which of them was going to be Rome's next king. The Oracle of Delphi responded that the first among them to kiss their mother "shall hold supreme sway in Rome."<ref>Livy, Ab urbe condita, 1.56</ref> Brutus interpreted "mother" to mean Gaia, so he pretended to trip and kissed the ground.

Brutus, along with Spurius Lucretius Tricipitinus, Publius Valerius Poplicola, and Lucius Tarquinius Collatinus were summoned by Lucretia to Collatia after she had been raped by Sextus Tarquinius, the son of the king Tarquinius Superbus.  Lucretia, believing that the rape dishonoured her and her family, committed suicide by stabbing herself with a dagger after telling of what had befallen her.  According to legend, Brutus grabbed the dagger from Lucretia's breast after her death and immediately shouted for the overthrow of the Tarquins.

The four men gathered the youth of Collatia, then went to Rome where Brutus, being at that time Tribunus Celerum, summoned the people to the forum and exhorted them to rise up against the king.  The people voted for the deposition of the king, and the banishment of the royal family.

The leaders of the revolt were close relatives of the king: Brutus was the king's nephew and Lucius Tarquinius Collatinus was king's cousin. The king, who was conducting a war near and camped at Ardea, rushed to Rome on news of the coup, but found the city barred; at the same time, the coup leaders won over the army and then expelled the king's sons. Tarquinius Superbus fled with his family into exile.

In the aftermath following the overthrow Brutus is credited by later historians such as Tacitus as "establishing liberty and the consulate".

 The Oath of Brutus 
According to Livy, Brutus' first act after the expulsion of Lucius Tarquinius Superbus was to bring the people to swear an oath never to allow any man again to be king in Rome.

 

 (First of all, by swearing an oath that they would suffer no man to rule Rome, it forced the people, desirous of a new liberty, not to be thereafter swayed by the entreaties or bribes of kings.)

This is, fundamentally, a restatement of the 'private oath' sworn by the conspirators to overthrow the monarchy:

 

 (By this guiltless blood before the kingly injustice I swear – you and the gods as my witnesses – I make myself the one who will prosecute, by what force I am able, Lucius Tarquinius Superbus along with his wicked wife and the whole house of his freeborn children by sword, by fire, by any means hence, so that neither they nor any one else be suffered to rule Rome.)

There is no scholarly agreement that the oath took place; it is reported, although differently, by Plutarch (Poplicola, 2) and Appian (B.C. 2.119). Nevertheless, the spirit of the oath inspired later Romans including his descendant Marcus Junius Brutus.

Consulship and death
Brutus and Lucretia's bereaved husband, Lucius Tarquinius Collatinus, were elected as the first consuls of Rome (509 BC). Tradition says that this election was conducted by Spurius Lucretius Tricipitinus, who Brutus had appointed as interrex in his position as tribunus celerum. Brutus' first acts during his consulship, according to Livy, included administering an oath to the people of Rome to never again accept a king in Rome (see above) and replenishing the number of senators to 300 from the principal men of the equites. 

Later-day Romans attributed many institutions to Brutus, including:
 the taking of auspices before entering office,
 use of the Curiate Assembly to bestow consular imperium,
 alternation of fasces between the consuls (also attributed to others),
 expansion of the senate in adding the minores gentes, and
 dedication of a temple to Carna on the Coelian hill.

The new consuls also created a new office of rex sacrorum to carry out the religious duties that had previously been performed by the kings.

During his consulship the royal family made an attempt to regain the throne, firstly by their ambassadors seeking to subvert a number of the leading Roman citizens in the Tarquinian conspiracy.  Amongst the conspirators were two brothers of Brutus' wife, Vitellia, and Brutus' two sons: Titus Junius Brutus and Tiberius Junius Brutus. The conspiracy was discovered and the consuls determined to punish the conspirators with death.  Brutus gained respect for his stoicism in watching the execution of his own sons, even though he showed emotion during the punishment.Livy, Ab urbe condita, 2.3-4 Following this, he either forced his co-consul Collatinus to resign or otherwise had him removed – either because of enmity to his relationship to the Tarquins or due to his lack of harshness in punishing the conspirators – and then presided over the election of a suffect consul, Publius Valerius Poplicola.

Tarquinius again sought to retake the throne soon after at the Battle of Silva Arsia, leading the forces of Tarquinii and Veii against the Roman army.  Valerius led the infantry, and Brutus led the cavalry. Arruns Tarquinius, the king's son, led the Etruscan cavalry.  The cavalry joined the battle and Arruns, having spied from afar the lictors, and thereby recognising the presence of a consul, soon saw that Brutus was in command of the cavalry.  The two men, who were cousins, charged each other, and speared each other to death.  The infantry also soon joined the battle, the result being in doubt for some time.  The right wing of each army was victorious, the army of Tarquinii forcing back the Romans, and the Veientes being routed.  However the Etruscan forces eventually fled the field, the Romans claiming the victory.

Some time during his consulship, he is supposed to have signed a treaty with Carthage and dedicated the Capitoline temple, reported in Polybius. This, along with the unanimous reporting of Roman sources, is the main evidence of his historicity.

The surviving consul, Valerius, after celebrating a triumph for the victory, held a funeral for Brutus with much magnificence.  The Roman noblewomen mourned him for one year, for his vengeance of Lucretia's violation.

 Brutus in literature and art 

The profile of Lucius Junius Brutus is on a coin that was minted by Marcus Junius Brutus following the assassination of Julius Caesar.

Lucius Junius Brutus is prominent in English literature, and he was popular among British and American Whigs.

A reference to Lucius Junius Brutus is in the following lines from Shakespeare's play The Tragedie of Julius Cæsar, (Cassius to Marcus Brutus, Act 1, Scene 2).

 "O, you and I have heard our fathers say,
 There was a Brutus once that would have brookt
 Th'eternal devil to keep his state in Rome
 As easily as a king."

One of the main charges of the senatorial faction that plotted against Julius Caesar after he had the Roman Senate declare him dictator for life, was that he was attempting to make himself a king, and a co-conspirator Cassius, enticed Brutus' direct descendant, Marcus Junius Brutus, to join the conspiracy by referring to his ancestor.

Lucius Junis Brutus is a leading character in Shakespeare's Rape of Lucrece and in Nathaniel Lee's Restoration tragedy (1680), Lucius Junius Brutus; Father of his Country.Before the Glorious Revolution, Nathaniel Lee's Lucius Junius Brutus was banned in December of 1680 for portraying the Whig cause (Protestantism, no royal prerogatives, encouragement to trade and industry, empire) as Roman republicanism.

In The Mikado, the protagonist Nanki-poo refers to his father the Emperor as "the Lucius Junius Brutus of his race", for being willing to enforce his own law even if it means killing his son.

The memory of L. J. Brutus also had a profound impact on Italian patriots, including those who established the ill-fated short-lived Roman Republic in February 1849.

Brutus was a hero of republicanism during the Enlightenment and Neoclassical periods. In 1789, at the dawn of the French Revolution, master painter Jacques-Louis David publicly exhibited his politically charged master-work, The Lictors Bring to Brutus the Bodies of His Sons, to great controversy.  David's contemporary, Guillaume Guillon-Lethière depicted the scene of Brutus' sons' executions in grand style in his work Brutus Condemning His Sons to Death'' (1788).

See also
 Junia gens
 Junius

References

Citations

Bibliography

External links 

 Livius.org: Lucius Junius Brutus

|-

509 BC deaths
6th-century BC Roman consuls
Ancient Roman generals
Ancient Romans killed in action
Characters in Book VI of the Aeneid
Filicides
Lucius
Revolutionaries
Year of birth unknown